The Acacia Highway is a section of the Cebu South Road that stretches from Tinaan, Naga to Valladolid, Carcar in Cebu, Philippines.

It is lined with raintrees and acacia. The trees were planted in 1915 by the personnel of the Bureau of Public Works, the DPWH’s predecessor.

Roads in Cebu